"The First Cut Is the Deepest" is a song by Cat Stevens, covered by many artists.

The First Cut Is the Deepest or First Cut Is the Deepest may also refer to:
The First Cut Is the Deepest (album), an album by Michie Mee
"The First Cut Is the Deepest" (Grey's Anatomy), an episode of the TV series
"The First Cut Is the Deepest", an episode of Entourage
"The First Cut Is the Deepest", an episode of One Tree Hill
"First Cut Is the Deepest", an episode of Kyle XY